Edmund Peyton Burdick (born February 26, 1997) is an American professional baseball outfielder for the Miami Marlins of Major League Baseball (MLB). He made his MLB debut in 2022.

Amateur career
Burdick attended Glen Este High School in Cincinnati, Ohio, where he played baseball, basketball, and football. In 2014, as a junior, he batted .368 alongside pitching to a 2.13 ERA. He was undrafted in the 2015 Major League Baseball draft, and enrolled at Wright State University where he played college baseball. In 2016, his freshman season at Wright State, he batted .289 with four home runs and 31 RBIs over 63 games. He missed the 2017 season after undergoing Tommy John surgery. He returned to play in 2018, hitting .347 with nine home runs and 65 RBIs over 56 starts. That summer, he played in the Cape Cod Baseball League with the Cotuit Kettleers. In 2019, his redshirt junior season, he slashed .407/.538/.729 with 15 home runs and 72 RBIs over 59 games.

Professional career
After the season, Burdick was selected by the Miami Marlins in the third round of the 2019 Major League Baseball draft. He signed and made his professional debut with the Batavia Muckdogs of the Class A Short Season New York–Penn League before being promoted to the Clinton LumberKings of the Class A Midwest League. Over 69 games between the two clubs, he batted .308 with 11 home runs, 64 RBIs, and twenty doubles. He did not play a minor league game in 2020 due to the cancellation of the minor league season caused by the COVID-19 pandemic. To begin the 2021 season, he was assigned to the Pensacola Blue Wahoos of the Double-A South, slashing .231/.376/.472 with 23 home runs and 52 RBIs over 106 games. He set Pensacola single-season records for home runs and walks (76). After Pensacola's season ended, he was promoted to the Jacksonville Jumbo Shrimp of the Triple-A East in mid-September with whom he appeared in eight games. Miami named Burdick their Minor League Player of the Year. He returned to Jacksonville to begin the 2022 season.

On August 4, 2022, the Marlins selected Burdick's contract and promoted him to the major leauges. He made his MLB debut the next day as the team's starting left fielder versus the Chicago Cubs at Wrigley Field, going hitless over four plate appearances with three strikeouts and an eight pitch walk. He recorded his first MLB hit on August 6 with a single off of Drew Smyly. He hit his first MLB home run on August 7, a solo home run off of Adrian Sampson.

References

External links

Wright State Raiders bio

1997 births
Living people
People from Batavia, Ohio
Baseball players from Ohio
Major League Baseball outfielders
Miami Marlins players
Wright State Raiders baseball players
Cotuit Kettleers players
Batavia Muckdogs players
Clinton LumberKings players
Pensacola Blue Wahoos players
Jacksonville Jumbo Shrimp players